The following is a partial list of dams and reservoirs in Botswana. 

List of dams (reservoirs)

See also

 List of rivers of Botswana
 Lakes of Botswana
 List of dams and reservoirs

References

Dams and reservoirs
Botswana
Dams